Telamoptilia hemistacta is a moth of the family Gracillariidae. It is known from India (Bihar), Taiwan, Japan (the Ryukyu Islands) and Madagascar.

The wingspan is about 7 mm.

The larvae feed on Achyranthes species, including Achyranthes aspera, Achyranthes bidentata and Achyranthes japonica. They probably mine the leaves of their host plant.

References

Acrocercopinae
Moths of Madagascar
Moths of Asia
Moths of Japan
Moths of Africa
Moths described in 1924